Toshio is a common masculine Japanese given name.

Possible writings
Toshio can be written using different kanji characters and can mean:

敏夫, "agile, man"
敏男, "agile, man"
敏雄, "agile, male"
俊夫, "sagacious, man"
俊雄, "sagacious, male"
利生, "advantage, life"
寿雄, "long life, male"
登志男, "ascend, intention, man"

The name can also be written in hiragana としお or katakana トシオ.

Notable people with the name

, Japanese water polo player
Toshio Furukawa (古川 登志夫, born 1946), Japanese voice actor
Toshio Gotō (後藤 俊夫, born 1938), Japanese film director
Toshio Iwai (岩井 俊雄, born 1962), Japanese interactive media and installation artist
, Japanese footballer
, Japanese fencer
Toshio Kakei (筧 利夫, born 1962), Japanese actor
Toshio Kimura (木村 俊夫, 1909–1983), Japanese politician
Toshio Maeda (前田 俊夫, born 1953), Japanese manga artist
Toshio Masuda (舛田 利雄, born 1927), Japanese film director
, Japanese film director
, Japanese dancer and actor
, Japanese writer, publisher and businessman
Toshio Nakanishi, a Japanese musician and an artist
Tosiwo Nakayama (中山 利雄, 1931–2003), first president of the Federated States of Micronesia
Toshio Odate (トシオ・オダテ, born 1930), Japanese-born American sculptor
Toshio Ogawa (小川 敏夫, born 1948), Japanese politician
Toshio Shibata (柴田 敏雄, born 1949), Japanese photographer
Toshio Shimao (島尾 敏雄, 1917–1986), Japanese novelist
Toshio Suzuki (driver) (鈴木 利男, born 1955), Japanese racing driver
Toshio Suzuki (producer) (鈴木 敏夫, born 1948), chief producer of the Japanese animation studio Studio Ghibli
Toshio Tosanoumi (土佐ノ海 敏生, born 1972), Japanese sumo wrestler
, Japanese politician
, Japanese water polo player
, Japanese bobsledder
, Japanese politician
, Japanese politician
Toshio Yamane (山根 敏郎, born 1953), Japanese photographer
Toshio Narahashi (トシオ・ナラハシ, 1927–2013), Japanese-born American pharmacologist

Fictional characters
Toshio Ozaki (尾崎 敏夫), a protagonist in the horror novel/manga/anime series Shiki.
Toshio Saeki (Ju-on) (佐伯 俊雄), a main antagonist in the Japanese horror series Ju-on
Toshio Utsumi (内海 俊夫), a character in the anime and manga series Cat's Eye

Japanese masculine given names